Ford railway station was a station located on the North Mersey Branch, north Liverpool, Merseyside, England.

History
It opened for service on 1 June 1906 and closed on 2 April 1951. Passenger trains then only ran once a year on this line, transporting passengers for the Grand National, although this service also ceased in 1956. Demolition of Ford station was completed on 1 May 1959.

Reopening proposals
This section of the line still exists, although has no passenger services running and is no longer electrified, with the only trains running being for engineer access to the Ormskirk line. Plans to open this section as part of Merseyrail's Northern Line have been put forward in Sefton's transport plan, with the first details to emerge about its possible reopening being published by the media on 28 February 2008.

See also
 Ford district

References

External links
 Ford railway station at Disused Stations

Disused railway stations in the Metropolitan Borough of Sefton
Former Lancashire and Yorkshire Railway stations
Railway stations in Great Britain opened in 1906
Railway stations in Great Britain closed in 1951